Ali Sher may refer to:

People
Ali Sher Bengali, 16th-century Muslim theologian
Ali Sher Hyderi, 20th-century political leader from Sindh, Pakistan
Ali Sher Khalji, 13th-century governor of Bengal
Ali Sher Khan Anchan, 17th-century king from Skardu, Baltistan
Mir Ali Sher Qaune Thattvi, 18th-century historian from Thatta, Sindh
Alisher Barotov, footballer from Tajikistan
Alisher Chingizov, 21st-century swimmer from Tajikistan
Alisher Dodov, 21st-century footballer from Tursunzoda, Tajikistan
Alisher Dzhalilov, 21st-century footballer from Latakhorak, Tajikistan
Alisher Gulov, 21st-century taekwondo practitioner from Tajikistan
Alisher Karamatov, 21st-century rural development activist
Alisher Mirzo, 20th-century painter from Tashkent, Uzbekistan
Alisher Mirzoev, 21st-century footballer from Tajikistan
Alisher Mukhtarov, 21st-century judoka from Uzbekistan
Alisher Qudratov, 21st-century alpine skier from Tajikistan
Alisher Rahimov, boxer from Uzbekistan
Alisher Saipov, Uzbek journalist from Kyrgyzstan
Alisher Seitov, 21st-century diver from Kazakhstan
Alisher Tukhtaev, former footballer and coach from Tajikistan
Alisher Tuychiev, footballer from Tajikistan of Uzbek origin
Alisher Usmanov, 21st-century Russian oligarch from Uzbekistan
Alisher Yergali, 21st-century freestyle wrestler from Kazakhstan
Alisher Zhumakan, 21st-century cyclist from Kazakhstan
Ali-Shir Nava'i, 15th-century polymath from Herat, Afghanistan
Jam Ali Sher, medieval ruler of Sindh, present-day Pakistan

Places
Alışar, Azerbaijan, also spelt as Alisher
Alisher Navoiy (Tashkent Metro), a railway station in Uzbekistan
Alisher Navoiy Secondary School (Isfana), a school in Kyrgyzstan
The Alisher Navoi State Museum of Literature, in Uzbekistan
Bagh Ali Shir, in Jiroft County, Iran
Bagh-e Alishir, in Sarduiyeh, Iran
Borj-e Ali Shir-e Olya, in Dehdasht-e Gharbi, Iran
Borj-e Ali Shir, in Dehdasht-e Gharbi, Iran
Tachel Ali Shir, in Shalal and Dasht-e Gol, Iran
Talambrun Ali Shir, in Shalal and Dasht-e Gol, Iran

Other uses
Alisher Navoi (film), 1947 Soviet drama film

See also
 Sher Ali (disambiguation)